Epicephala trigonophora is a moth of the family Gracillariidae. It is known from Queensland, New South Wales in Australia and from Sri Lanka.

The wingspan is about 10 mm. Adults have a fringe along the trailing edge of each wing. The forewings have a pattern of light and dark brown markings. The hindwings are a uniform dark brown.

References

Epicephala
Moths described in 1900